James Munnik (1 October 1953 – 10 November 2010) was a South African cricketer. He played in one List A and six first-class matches for Boland from 1984/85 to 1987/88.

See also
 List of Boland representative cricketers

References

External links
 

1953 births
2010 deaths
South African cricketers
Boland cricketers
People from Graaff-Reinet
Cricketers from the Eastern Cape